Hosseinabad ( Romanized as Hosseinābād, formerly known as Rashg-e Shavur also known as Moslem Ebn-e ‘Aqīl, Rashk-e Shāhūr, Rashk-e Shāhvār, Shāhūr, Shahvar, and Shāvūr) is a city & capital of Shavur District, Shavur Rural District, Shush County, Khuzestan Province, Iran. At the 2006 census, its population was 8,344, in 1,294 families.

References 

Populated places in Shush County
Cities in Khuzestan Province